The 1958 France rugby union tour of South Africa was a series of matches played by the France national rugby union team in South Africa in July and August 1958. The French team played ten matches, of which they won five. One of the tour matches was against Rhodesia. They won the Test Series 1–0 against the Springboks.

Results
Scores and results list France's points tally first.

Tour match

The Tests

First Test

Second Test

Touring party
Manager: Serge Saulnier
Assistant Manager: Marcel Laurent
Captain: Lucien Mias

Forwards
Raoul Barrière
Jean Barthe
Robert Baulon
Jean Carrère
Louis Casaux
Michel Celaya
Pierre Danos
Jean Dupuy
Louis Echave
Pierre Fremaux
Jean de Grogorio
André Haget
Pierre Lacaze
Pierre Lacroix
Jacques Lepatey
Arnaud Marquesuzaa
Roger Martine
Bernard Mommejat
François Moncla
Aldo Quaglio
Henri Rancoule
Lucien Roge
Alfred Roques
Guy Stener
Michel Vannier
Roger Vigier

References

1958 rugby union tours
1958
1958
1958 in South African rugby union
1957–58 in French rugby union